Chikkamagaluru Lok Sabha Constituency was a former Lok Sabha (parliamentary) constituency in Karnataka state in southern India. With the implementation of the delimitation of parliamentary constituencies in 2008, it ceased to exist.

Assembly segments
Chikkamagaluru Lok Sabha Constituency comprised the following eight Legislative Assembly segments:
 Sringeri
 Mudigere
 Chikkamagaluru
 Birur
 Kadur
 Tarikere
 Karkala

Members of Parliament
Mysore State: (as Hassan Chickmagalur)
1951: H. Siddananjappa, Indian National Congress

Mysore State: (as Chikmagalur)
1967: M. Huchegowda, Praja Socialist Party
1971: D. B. Chandre Gowda, Indian National Congress

Karnataka State: (as Chikmagalur)
1977: D. B. Chandre Gowda, Indian National Congress
1978: Indira Gandhi, Indian National Congress (By Poll)
1980: D. M. Puttegowda, Indian National Congress (Indira)
1984: D. K. Taradevi, Indian National Congress
1989: D. M. Puttegowda, Indian National Congress (Indira)
1991: D. K. Taradevi, Indian National Congress (Indira)
1996: B. L. Shankar, Janata Dal
1998: D. C. Srikantappa, Bharatiya Janata Party
1999: D. C. Srikantappa, Bharatiya Janata Party
2004: D. C. Srikantappa, Bharatiya Janata Party
Post 2008 delimitation : Seat ceased to exist. With the implementation of the delimitation of parliamentary constituencies in 2008, this seat ceased to exist, and it was fully/mostly merged with Udupi-Chikkamagaluru seat.

See also
 Hassan Chickmagalur Lok Sabha constituency (1952 Election) 
 Chikmagalur district
 List of former constituencies of the Lok Sabha
 Udupi Chikmagalur Lok Sabha constituency  (2009 onwards)

Notes

Former constituencies of the Lok Sabha
2008 disestablishments in India
Constituencies disestablished in 2008
Former Lok Sabha constituencies of Karnataka